Thraco-Cimmerian is a historiographical and archaeological term, composed of the names of the Thracians and the Cimmerians. It refers to  8th to 7th century BC cultures that are linked in Eastern Central Europe and in the area west of the Black Sea.

Paul Reinecke in 1925 postulated a North-Thracian-Cimmerian cultural sphere (nordthrakisch-kimmerischer Kulturkreis) overlapping with the younger Hallstatt culture of the Eastern Alps. The term Thraco-Cimmerian (thrako-kimmerisch) was first introduced by Romanian archaeologist and historian Ion Nestor in the 1930s. It reflects a "migrationist" tendency in the archaeology of the first half of the 20th century to equate material archaeology with historical ethnicities. Nestor intended to suggest that there was a historical migration of Cimmerians into Eastern Europe from the area of the former Srubna culture, perhaps triggered by the Scythian expansion, at the beginning of the European Iron Age. This "migrationist" or "invasionist" theory, assuming that the development of the mature Hallstatt culture (Hallstatt C) was triggered by a Cimmerian invasion, was the scholarly mainstream until the 1980s. 
In the 1980s and 1990s, more systematic studies of the artefacts revealed a more gradual development over the period covering the 9th to 7th centuries, so that the term "Thraco-Cimmerian" is now rather used  by convention and does not necessarily imply a direct connection with either the Thracians or the Cimmerians.

Archaeologically, Thraco-Cimmerian artifacts consist of grave goods and hoards. The artifacts labelled Thraco-Cimmerian all belong to a category of upper class, luxury objects, like weapons, horse tacks and jewelry, and they are recovered only from a small percentage of graves of the period. They are metal (usually bronze) items, particularly parts of horse tacks, found in a late Urnfield context, but without local Urnfield predecessors for their type. They appear rather to spread from the Koban culture of the Caucasus and northern Georgia, which together with the Srubna culture, blends into the 9th to 7th centuries pre-Scythian Chernogorovka and Novocherkassk cultures. By the 7th century,  Thraco-Cimmerian objects are spread further west over most of Eastern and Central Europe, locations of finds reaching to Denmark and eastern Prussia in the north and to Lake Zürich in the west. Together with these bronze artifacts, earliest Iron items appear, ushering in the European Iron Age, corresponding to the Proto-Celtic expansion from the Hallstatt culture.

References

"Thrako-Kimmerer, thrako-kimmerischer Formenkreis" in: Hoops (ed.) Reallexikon der germanischen Altertumskunde, vol. 16, Walter de Gruyter, 2000, 517–519.
Ioannis K. Xydopoulos, "The Cimmerians: their origins, movements and their difficulties" in: Gocha R. Tsetskhladze, Alexandru Avram, James Hargrave (eds.),  The Danubian Lands between the Black,  Aegean and Adriatic Seas (7th Century BC – 10th Century AD), Proceedings of the Fifth International Congress on Black Sea Antiquities (Belgrade – 17–21 September 2013,  Archaeopress Archaeology (2015),  119–123.
Dorin Sârbu, "Un Fenomen Arheologic Controversat de la Începutul Epocii Fierului dintre Gurile Dunării și Volga: 'Cultura Cimmerianã'" ("A controversial archeological phenomenon of the early Iron Age between the mouths of the Danube and the Volga: the Cimmerian Culture"), Romanian Journal of Archaeology'' (2000) ( online version  (with bibliography);  English abstract)

External links
The Thraco-Cimmerian Bronze (German)

Iron Age Europe
Archaeological theory
Ancient Thrace
Cimmerians